Norfolk Southern Six Mile Bridge No. 58, also known as Six Mile Bridge, is a historic Pratt truss railroad bridge located near Lynchburg in Amherst County and Campbell County, Virginia. The bridge was originally constructed around 1853. It was rebuilt or modified in 1866, 1870, 1886, 1899, 1920, 1934, and 1957 to accommodate ever-increasing rail traffic and heavier loads. The original bridge was built by the South Side Railroad during the construction of its line between Petersburg and Lynchburg, and later maintained by the Norfolk Southern Railway. During the American Civil War, the bridge and the rail approach to Lynchburg was protected by Fort Riverview. It provided rail service between 1853 and 1972. It has been owned by the Mount Athos Regional Museum and Information Center, Inc., since 1993.

The bridge was added to the National Register of Historic Places in 1997.

See also
List of bridges on the National Register of Historic Places in Virginia

References

External links
Historic Riverview on the James

Norfolk Southern Railway bridges
Railroad bridges in Virginia
Railroad bridges on the National Register of Historic Places in Virginia
National Register of Historic Places in Amherst County, Virginia
National Register of Historic Places in Campbell County, Virginia
Bridges completed in 1869
Buildings and structures in Amherst County, Virginia
Buildings and structures in Campbell County, Virginia
1869 establishments in Virginia
Pratt truss bridges in the United States
Metal bridges in the United States